Homelessness in Florida is considered a major social issue, mainly due to its warm weather.

According to the United States Interagency Council on Homelessness, as of January 2017, there are an estimated 32,190 homeless individuals in Florida. Of this high number, 2,846 are family households, 2,019 are unaccompanied young adults (aged 18–24), 2,817 are veterans, and an estimated 5,615 are individuals experiencing chronic homelessness. According to a January 2020 count, this figure was 27,487 on any given day, a decrease from previous years. However, this figure could likely increase due to the moratorium for evictions that started in September and October of 2021.

Count
There are c. 30,000 homeless residents on an average year in Florida of 2010s and early 2020s, which is equivalent to 13 per 100,000 Floridians or 0.13%. This is significantly lower than the US's average of 0.18%.

Pinellas County has one of the highest concentrations of any Florida county, at nearly 0.3% with nearly 3,000 homeless people and a population in general of almost one million. It is second next to Miami-Dade County's homeless population at 4,235, but this is due to a higher general population (6 million; 0.08%) and still a lower prevalence closer to Florida and the U.S.'s average of being in between 0.1-0.2%. These are according to Florida Coalition for the Homeless' 2016 statistics; these figures may fluctuate and rise due to the 2021 evictions due to the moratorium endings. Monroe County, which has c. 75,000 people, has 575 recorded homeless individuals as of 2016, which is 0.8%.

General poverty in Florida
For 2016, the US Census Bureau reported that there were 3,116,886 people in poverty in Florida, or 15.7% of the state's population. 22.8% of them are children. Begging and panhandling are often a consequence of pervasive poverty due to the need to source money. When focusing on the laws against begging and panhandling it is important to begin with the fact that people become beggars and panhandlers for various reasons. They could be in that situation because of socio-economic issues, disability, loss of income due to natural disasters, discrimination due to being a minority group, lack of education, health issues and many more. Consequently, the approach to these social issues must be responsive to people's needs to help them escape poverty and the need to beg.

Cost of accountability and services
In 2013, a Central Florida Commission on Homelessness study indicated that the region spends $31,000 a year per homeless person to cover "salaries of law-enforcement officers to arrest and transport homeless individuals — largely for nonviolent offenses such as trespassing, public intoxication or sleeping in parks — as well as the cost of jail stays, emergency-room visits and hospitalization for medical and psychiatric issues." This did not include "money spent by nonprofit agencies to feed, clothe and sometimes shelter these individuals". In contrast, the report estimated the cost of permanent supportive housing at "$10,051 per person per year" and concluded that "[h]ousing even half of the region's chronically homeless population would save taxpayers $149 million during the next decade — even allowing for 10 percent to end up back on the streets again." This particular study followed 107 long-term-homeless residents living in Orange, Osceola, and Seminole Counties. There are similar studies showing large financial savings in Charlotte and Southeastern Colorado from focusing on simply housing the homeless.

Panhandling and begging
At the state level, Florida law addresses panhandling and begging and relate primarily to the ban on impeding traffic and roads, while city ordinances increasingly focus on behaviors and location of any panhandling or begging.

The National Veterans Homeless Support Initiative succinctly phrased current approaches to dealing with panhandling as "kick[ing] the can down the road", referring to the city of Melbourne in Florida's new punitive sweeping ban on panhandling, adding locations such as ATMs and bus stops to its list of locations individuals can be incriminated for. In 2016 the City of Sarasota's panhandling laws were broadened to be stricter and include all forms of solicitation. The local police department also updated its approach to be more punitive by requiring police to remove unattended items in the streets such as personal items. Those who do not have a home in many Florida cities are facing the dilemma of being outlawed for begging to make money and then criminalized again for being homeless and having nowhere to place their belongings, compounding systemic social issues within the communities. In Lake Worth Beach, Florida, ordinance No. 2014-3 effectively bans panhandling across the entire city. It allows authorities to penalize individuals with a 60-day period in jail or $500 fine which they are unlikely to be able to afford. This has broader systemic issues on the mass incarceration dilemma within the American prison industrial complex because this results increased numbers of those involved in these activities being arrested and ending up within the prison system. Indeed, an issue with begging and panhandling laws across Florida and more broadly is the "selective enforcement of public spaces" and this is becoming more prevalent with tougher rules across cities in Florida which give police new powers.

In 2007, St. Petersburg, Florida passed half a dozen new ordinances aimed at homelessness and begging, including banning storage of belongings in public spaces and making it illegal to sleep in many public areas. Moreover, in 2006, Orlando, Florida passed ordinances that banned groups from feeding more than 25 people in public parks. In 2011, Huffington Post reported how the activist group Food Not Bombs had twelve members arrested for feeding panhandlers and beggars in Orlando, illustrating a new shift in ordinance punitive-ness aiming at not just those begging or panhandling but those willing to give. In Fort Lauderdale, Florida, it is forbidden to give food to homeless in parks also, illustrating the extent of anti-panhandling laws and their expansion in society. A report called 'Criminalising Crises', published by The National Law Centre on Homelessness and Poverty (NLCHP) highlights how the legal system criminalizes homelessness and does nothing to solve social problems. For example, in Alachua County, Florida, police can issue 'Notice to Appear' options for many offences, including panhandling, but this requires a permanent address. Many panhandlers do not have an address, and consequently the police must arrest the individual, placing them in jails instead of dealing with their homelessness. The NLCHP also published a report, "No Safe Place," which highlights one of Florida's cities with the strongest criminalization policies: Clearwater, Florida. Clearwater has nearly half of its homeless population (42%) without access to emergency housing or affordable housing and, like other cities such as Orlando, heavily punishes sleeping or sitting in public and panhandling or begging.

Creative Housing Solutions in Florida found that to reduce the cycle of homeless and beggars going through criminal justice system and health care system, it would be more sustainable if permanent housing was given to chronically homeless, saving Central Florida $21,000 per person in law enforcement costs.

Some anti-panhandling laws have been found to be unconstitutional. Tampa's 2013 ordinance, which completely banned panhandling in the downtown area, was ruled unconstitutional by a federal judge in 2016. The city of Sarasota also revised its panhandling and solicitation laws in response to this decision.

Deterrence controversies
In July 2019, officials in West Palm Beach, Florida, were criticised for playing a continuous loop of the children's songs Baby Shark and Raining Tacos throughout the night outside city-owned Waterfront Lake Pavilion rental banquet facility as a way of deterring rough sleepers.

Sex offenders and legality
A special problem exists in Miami-Dade County, in which restrictive local legislation makes it almost impossible for sex offenders to find legal housing. About 300 are homeless as of 2018 (see Julia Tuttle Causeway sex offender colony).

Violence
Like with many homeless communities in the US, violence is an issue that takes place in homeless tent encampments, trailer encampments, and shelters. This includes both crimes of unhoused people victimizing fellow unhoused people, and housed people committing a crime against an unhoused person, sometimes solely or mainly due to the fact that their victim was of an unhoused state. Two homeless men were murdered in Miami, one stabbed dead in October 2021 and one shot dead in December 2021, allegedly by the same person. On the same day of the December shooting, a homeless man was shot and wounded several hours prior. The suspect, a housed 25-year-old real estate agent, was arrested in December and charged with two counts of murder. He was formally charged in February.

References

Housing in Florida
Florida